Tanah Merah (literally "Red Land or Red Soil" in Malay) may refer to a variety of places:

 Tanah Merah District, a district in the state of Kelantan, Malaysia
 Tanah Merah, Singapore, a region located in eastern Singapore
 Tanah Merah, Queensland, Australia
 Tanahmerah, Papua, Indonesia
 Tanahmerah Bay, Papua, Indonesia

Tanah Merah may also designate two languages:
Tanah Merah or Sumeri language (Trans–New Guinea phylum)
Tanah Merah or Tabla language (Sentani group)

See also
Redland (disambiguation)